Byasa plutonius, the Chinese windmill, is a butterfly found in Asia that belongs to the windmills genus (Byasa), comprising tailed black swallowtail butterflies with white spots and red submarginal crescents.

The two subspecies in the Indian subcontinent have the common names of Pemberton's windmill and Tytler's windmill.

Range
This butterfly lives in south-western China, Bhutan, Nepal and north-east India.

In India, it is found in the states of Sikkim, Assam, Manipur, Nagaland and Mizoram.

Status
A rare species of high elevations, two subspecies are protected in India:
 B. p. pembertoni, Pemberton's Chinese windmill (may be contracted to Pemberton's windmill)
 B. p. tytleri, Tytler's Chinese windmill (may be contracted to Tytler's windmill)

Taxonomy
There are three subspecies.

Description
 Wingspan: 100–120 mm.
 Tail black in both sexes.
 Male: Above, brownish black and unmarked except for a row of markings.
Pemberton's windmill (Sikkim, Bhutan) - This row from veins 2 to 6 on the upper hindwing consists of whitish marginal spots.
 Tytler's windmill (Manipur, Naga and Chin hills) - This row consists of prominent black marginal spots on the upper hindwing and small red spot in vein 2.
 Female: Above, paler. The female has traces of red lunules on the margins from veins 3 to 6 on the upper hindwing.

References

External links

Global Butterfly Information System - Text, images of syntype.

Byasa
Butterflies of Asia
Butterflies described in 1907